Natchez Trace (also known as Bandits of the Natchez Trace) is a 1960 American film starring Zachary Scott, Marcia Henderson, and William Campbell, produced by Lloyd Royal and Tom Garraway, and directed by Alan Crosland, Jr. The now-lost film was based on a novel of the same name by William Bradford Huie.

Plot
The film takes place in the 1820s focusing on the exploits of John Murrell, a slave trader and bandit who worked the central part of the Natchez Trace in the 1820s and 1830s. The plot centers around the revenge against Murrell by a bank clerk following the abduction of his fiancé and murder of her father.

Production
The film premiered in Waynesboro, Tennessee, near where filming took place in Perry County, Tennessee and Wayne County, Tennessee in 1957. It is possible that some filming took place in or near Meridian, Mississippi, where the production company was headquartered. 

Prior to filming commencing, both the film's director and second lead were swapped. Actor Gene Nelson had originally been cast as the film's second lead, however Nelson was hospitalized following an injury sustained during rehearsals, causing the role to be taken over by William Campbell. Director Ray Nazarro was originally slated to direct the film, however a scheduling conflict precluded his participation, causing the producers to offer the job to Crosland.

References

External links
 
 

1960s English-language films
Lost American films
American historical films
1960s American films